Zoran Prerad (born August 15, 1971 in Banja Luka) is a Bosnian Serb taekwondo practitioner, who competed in the men's heavyweight category. He claimed a bronze medal in the 83-kg division at the 1995 World Taekwondo Championships in Manila, Philippines, retrieved the men's heavyweight title at the 1998 European Championships in Eindhoven, Netherlands, and became the first and only Bosnian taekwondo jin to mark his 2004 Olympic debut in Athens.

Prerad qualified as a lone 31-year-old taekwondo fighter for the Bosnian squad in the men's heavyweight class (+80 kg) at the 2004 Summer Olympics in Athens, by receiving a tripartite invitation from the International Taekwondo Federation. Having a lack of international experience to the sport, Prerad fell short on a clear 13–2 gap to Spanish practitioner Jon García in his opening match. With Garcia losing the quarterfinals to South Korea's Moon Dae-sung, Prerad denied his chance to compete for Bosnia and Herzegovina's possible Olympic medal in the repechage.

References

External links
 
 

1971 births
Living people
Bosnia and Herzegovina male taekwondo practitioners
Serbian male taekwondo practitioners
Olympic taekwondo practitioners of Bosnia and Herzegovina
Taekwondo practitioners at the 2004 Summer Olympics
Sportspeople from Banja Luka
Serbs of Bosnia and Herzegovina
European Taekwondo Championships medalists
World Taekwondo Championships medalists